The Casino Reinvestment Development Authority or CRDA is a New Jersey state governmental agency that was founded in 1984 and is responsible for directing the spending of casino reinvestment funds in public and private projects to benefit Atlantic City and other areas of the state. From 1985 through April 2008, CRDA spent US$1.5 billion on projects in Atlantic City and US$300 million throughout New Jersey.

Reinvestment funds are received from New Jersey casinos, which are required by law to contribute 1.25% of gross revenue funds toward projects that are approved by the CRDA.

Composition
The CRDA has seventeen members as follows:

Four year terms
Six members of the public are appointed by the Governor and confirmed by the Senate
Two members recommended by the President of the Senate are appointed by the Governor
Two members recommended by the Speaker of the General Assembly are appointed by the Governor

Two year term
Two casino representatives are appointed by the Governor

Ex officio
One member of the Casino Control Commission is appointed by the Governor
The Mayor of Atlantic City
The State Treasurer
The Attorney General
The Commissioner of the Department of Commerce and Economic Development or the Department of Community Affairs, or an additional member of the Casino Control Commission is appointed by the Governor

References

External links
Official Website

Atlantic City, New Jersey
Gambling in New Jersey
Government agencies established in 1984
State agencies of New Jersey